Dream Girl is a play by Elmer Rice.

At its core is Georgina Allerton, a young woman whose efforts to run a bookstore are undermined severely by her tendency to drift off into Walter Mitty-like flights of fancy on a regular basis. The play's time span covers a single day of her life, during which several successive extravagant and often comic daydreams are portrayed.

The Broadway production, directed by the playwright, opened on December 14, 1945 at the Coronet Theatre, where it closed exactly one year later following a run of 348 performances. The cast included Betty Field and Wendell Corey.

Lucille Ball headlined a national touring production in 1947.

A 1948 screen version, directed by Mitchell Leisen, starred Betty Hutton, Macdonald Carey, Peggy Wood, and Walter Abel. In 1965, it was adapted for the Broadway musical stage under the title Skyscraper.

In 1955 a televised version adapted by S. Mark Smith was presented in the Hallmark Hall of Fame series. It starred Vivian Blaine.

References

External links

1945 plays
Broadway plays
Plays by Elmer Rice
American plays adapted into films